The 49th Telluride Film Festival took place September 2–5, 2022. In June 2022, it was announced that the festival would receive the dissident Russian filmmakers Kantemir Balagov and Kira Kovalenko as Guest Directors "as key collaborators in the Festival's programming decisions, bringing new ideas and overlooked films to Telluride". In July 2022 it was announced that author, artist, graphic novelist and publisher Leanne Shapton would design the annual poster for the 49th edition.

Although only divulging its full line-up on the day before it begins, the festival's selections usually can be correctly assumed through films' premiere status in other major fall season film festivals, such as the Venice Film Festival, the Toronto International Film Festival and the New York Film Festival. This year's edition has also been commented by Venice Film Festival's Alberto Barbera, who confirmed in an interview for Variety that the Venice premieres Luca Guadagnino's Bones and All, Todd Field's Tár and Alejandro González Iñárritu's Bardo were on Telluride's selection. It was also reported that Sarah Polley's Women Talking was being fought over by Telluride, Venice and Toronto, with the former getting the film's world premiere. The rivalry between the festivals in regards of screening status is not unprecedented, as exemplified by Telluride's stealing the World Premiere status of the Kenneth Branagh's film Belfast out of Toronto's hands in 2021. In 2022, adding to their Sneak Preview selection, the festival was able to swipe Aftersuns and All the Beauty and the Bloodsheds North America Premiere status ahead of TIFF.

Marked by the presence of documentaries, the 2022 edition also saw the presence of "several films making their North American debuts after first premiering at Cannes in May and Venice which is running simultaneously". The awardees of the Silver Medallion all had their films screened at the festival: actress Cate Blanchett (who starred in Tár), director and actress Sarah Polley (who wrote and directed Women Talking) and documentary director Mark Cousins (who directed both The March on Rome and My Name is Alfred Hitchcock).

Official selections

Main program

Main Slate: Episodic Form and Short Form

Sneak Previews

Guest Director's Selections 
Movies selected for screening at the festival by Kantemir Balagov and Kira Kovalenko.

Backlot

Special Screenings

Filmmakers of Tomorrow official selection

Student Prints 
Curated and introduced by Gregory Nava.

Calling Cards 
Curated and introduced by Barry Jenkins.

Calling Cards — Redband 
Curated and introduced by Barry Jenkins.

Silver Medallion 
 Cate Blanchett, actress (for Tár)
 Sarah Polley, actress, director, and writer (for Women Talking)
 Mark Cousins, filmmaker (for My Name is Alfred Hitchcock and The March on Rome)

References 

Telluride
Telluride Film Festival
2022 in Colorado